Paul Groves (born 27 May 1965) is a former professional rugby league footballer who played in the 1980s and 1990s.

Playing career

St Helens
In October 1987, Groves signed for St Helens from Salford for a fee of £40,000. He played  in St Helens' 15–14 victory over Leeds in the 1987–88 John Player Special Trophy Final during the 1987–88 season at Central Park, Wigan on 9 January 1988.

Groves played  in St Helens' 24–14 victory over Rochdale Hornets in the 1991 Lancashire Cup Final during the 1991–92 season at Wilderspool Stadium, Warrington, on 20 October 1991.

International honours
Groves won a cap for Great Britain while at St Helens in 1987 against Papua New Guinea. He was selected to go on the 1988 Great Britain Lions tour of Australasia but didn't play in any Test matches.

References

External links
Profile at saints.org.uk
Statistics at orl-heritagetrust.org.uk

1966 births
Living people
Great Britain national rugby league team players
Lancashire rugby league team players
Oldham R.L.F.C. players
Place of birth missing (living people)
Rugby league hookers
Salford Red Devils players
St Helens R.F.C. players